Scymnus (Neopullus) fuscatus, is a species of lady beetle found in Japan, Formosa, China, Philippines, Sunda Islands, India, Sri Lanka, Nepal and Australia.

Description
Adult female lays about 480 eggs singly, with an incubation period of about 3 days. There are four instar grub stages. Pupal stage ranges about 4 days. Longevity of the male is 14 days and females with 46 days, respectively. Grubs are aphidophagous that feed on Aphis gossypii. Adult with brownish body. There is a large red patch found on elytra. Body clothed with short hair.

References

Coccinellidae
Insects of Sri Lanka
Beetles described in 1859